Philippe Duvernay (born 17 June 1970) is a French diver. He competed in the men's 3 metre springboard event at the 1992 Summer Olympics.

References

External links
 

1970 births
Living people
French male divers
Olympic divers of France
Divers at the 1992 Summer Olympics
Sportspeople from Lyon